"Empty Arms" is a song composed and first recorded by Ivory Joe Hunter which became an R&B hit in 1957. This original version peaked at #2 on the US, R&B Airplay chart and at #43 on the pop chart.

Cover Versions
A cover version by Teresa Brewer became a hit the same month as the original recording.  
The song was successfully revived with a 1971 single by Sonny James.  "Empty Arms" was Sonny James' eighteenth number one on the country charts.  The single stayed at number one for four weeks and spent a total of fifteen weeks on the chart.

Chart performance

Sonny James

References 

1971 singles
Sonny James songs
Songs written by Ivory Joe Hunter
Capitol Records singles
1957 songs
Teresa Brewer songs